Derek Shearer (born December 5, 1946) is an American former diplomat who served as the United States Ambassador to Finland. He is currently employed by Occidental College, directing the McKinnon Center for Global Affairs and serving as a Chevalier Professor of Diplomacy and World Affairs.

Life and career
Shearer was born in Los Angeles on December 5, 1946. He received a bachelor's degree from Yale University. His roommate at Yale was Strobe Talbott. Shearer received a doctoral degree from the Union Graduate School.

Shearer held his ambassador post from 1994 through 1997, and before that served in the United States Department of Commerce. He had co-written the book Economic Democracy.

He is the son of gossip columnist Lloyd Shearer. He has a younger brother, Cody, and a sister, Brooke. The parents of his father had immigrated from Austria. His roommate Talbott married his sister Brooke. Shearer was married to Ruth Yannatta Goldway, who had served as the mayor of Santa Monica, California.

As of 2009, Derek Shearer lives in the Pacific Palisades community of Los Angeles with his wife, Sue Toigo, a financial consultant.

References

External links

1946 births
Living people
Occidental College faculty
Ambassadors of the United States to Finland
Yale University alumni
American people of Austrian descent
Union Institute & University alumni